John Field (26 July 1782 – 23 January 1837) was an Irish pianist, composer, and teacher widely credited as the inventor of the nocturne. While other composers were writing in a similar style at this time, Field was the first to use the term 'Nocturne' specifically to apply to a character piece featuring a cantabile melody over an arpeggiated accompaniment. 

He was born into a musical family, in Dublin, and received his early education there, in particular with the Italian composer Tommaso Giordani. The family moved to London in 1793, where Field studied under Muzio Clementi, and under whose tutelage Field soon became a famous and sought-after concert pianist. Together, master and pupil visited Paris, Vienna, and St. Petersburg. Ambiguity surrounds Field's decision to remain in the former Russian capital, but it is likely that Field acted as a sales representative for the Clementi Pianos.

Field was very highly regarded by his contemporaries and his playing and compositions influenced many major composers, including Frédéric Chopin, Johannes Brahms, Robert Schumann, and Franz Liszt.  Although little is known of Field in Russia, he undoubtedly contributed substantially to concerts and teaching, and to the development of the Russian piano school.

Notable students include Prussian pianist and composer Charles Mayer, the Franco-Russian composer Alexandre Dubuque, and Polish pianist and composer Antoine de Kontski.

Biography

1782–1801: Early life
 
Field was born 26 July 1782 in Golden Lane, Dublin, the eldest son of Irish parents who were members of the Church of Ireland. He was baptised 30 September. His father, Robert Field, earned his living by playing the violin in Dublin theatres. Field first studied the piano under his grandfather (also named John Field), who was a professional organist, and later under Tommaso Giordani. He made his debut at the age of nine, a performance that was well-received, on 24 March 1792 in Dublin. According to an early biographer, W. H. Grattan Flood, Field started composing in Ireland, but no evidence exists to support his claim. Flood also asserted that Field's family moved to Bath, Somerset, in 1793 and lived there for a short time, and this too is considered unlikely by modern researchers. By late 1793, though, the Fields had settled in London, where the young pianist started studying with Muzio Clementi. This arrangement was made possible by Field's father, who was perhaps able to secure the apprenticeship through Giordani, who knew Clementi.

Field continued giving public performances and soon became famous in London, attracting favourable comments from the press and the local musicians. Around 1795 his performance of a Dussek piano concerto was praised by Haydn. Field continued his studies with Clementi, also helping the Italian with the making and selling of instruments. He also took up violin playing, which he studied under J. P. Solomon. His first published compositions were issued by Clementi in 1795; the first historically important work, the Piano Concerto No. 1, H 27, was premiered by the composer in London on 7 February 1799, when he was aged 16. Field's first official opus was a set of three piano sonatas published by (and dedicated to) Clementi in 1801.

1802–1829: Settling in Russia
In summer 1802 Field and Clementi left London and went to Paris on business. They soon travelled to Vienna, where Field took a brief course in counterpoint under Johann Georg Albrechtsberger and had a  meeting with Beethoven, for whom Field played in October, and Beethoven highly praised him. In early winter he arrived in Saint Petersburg. Field was inclined to stay, impressed by the artistic life of the city. Clementi left in June 1803, but not before securing Field a teaching post in Narva and "appointing" the young man as his deputy, so that Field would receive similarly high fees. After Clementi's departure, Field had a busy concert season, eventually performing at the newly founded Saint Petersburg Philharmonic Society. In 1805 Field embarked on a concert tour of the Baltic states, staying in Saint Petersburg during the summer. The following year he gave his first concert in Moscow. Clementi arranged the publication of some of Field's old works in Russia in late 1806; he evidently sold Field a piano in exchange for music. Field returned to Moscow in April 1807 and apparently did not revisit Saint Petersburg until 1811 (but he kept his apartment at Vasilievsky Island). In 1810 he married Adelaide Percheron, a French pianist and former pupil.

Up to 1808 almost all publications of Field's music were reissues of old works. In 1808–9 he finally began publishing newly composed music, starting with piano variations on Russian folksongs: Air russe varié for piano 4 hands, H 10, and Kamarinskaya for piano, H 22. In 1811 the composer returned to Saint Petersburg. He spent the next decade of his life here, more productive than ever before, publishing numerous new pieces and producing corrected editions of old ones. He was successful in establishing a fruitful collaboration with both H. J. Dalmas, the most prominent Russian publisher of the time, and Breitkopf & Härtel, one of the most important music publishing houses of Europe. In 1815 Field fathered an illegitimate son, Leon Charpentier (later ), but remained with his wife. They had a son, Adrien, in 1819; Leon would later become a famous tenor, active in Russia, while Adrien followed his father's steps and became a pianist. By 1819 Field was sufficiently wealthy to be able to refuse the position of court pianist that was offered to him. His lifestyle and social behaviour were becoming more and more extravagant.

In 1818 Field revisited Moscow on business, prompted by his collaboration with the publisher Wenzel. He and his wife gave a series of concerts in the city in 1821, the last of which marked their last appearance in public together. Adelaide left Field soon afterward (taking Adrien with her) and attempted a solo career, which was not particularly successful. Field stayed in Moscow and continued performing and publishing his music. In 1822 he met Johann Nepomuk Hummel; the two collaborated on a performance of Hummel's Sonata for Piano 4-Hands, Op. 92.

1830–1837: Last years and death
Partly as a result of his extravagant lifestyle, Field's health began deteriorating by the mid-1820s. From about 1823 his concert appearances started decreasing; by the late 1820s he was suffering from rectal cancer. Field left for London to seek medical attention. He arrived in September 1831 and, after an operation, gave concerts there and in Manchester. He stayed in England for some time, meeting distinguished figures such as Mendelssohn and Moscheles. In March 1832 his former teacher and friend Clementi died, and Field served as pallbearer at his funeral. On Christmas Day 1832 Field was in Paris, performing his 7th Piano Concerto, which received a mixed reaction, just as at his recent concerts in England. After a series of concerts in various European cities, Field spent nine months (1834–5) in a Naples hospital. His Russian patrons rescued him. He briefly stayed with Carl Czerny in Vienna, where he gave three recitals, and then returned to Moscow with his son Adrien. He gave his last concert in March 1836 and died in Moscow almost a year later, on 23 January 1837, from pneumonia. He was buried in the Vvedenskoye Cemetery. According to an eyewitness report, when asked on his deathbed what his religion was, Field replied with a characteristic pun: "I am not a Calvinist, but a Claveciniste (French for harpsichordist)."

Music

Field became well-known for his post-London style, probably developed in Moscow around 1807. The characteristic texture is that of a chromatically decorated melody over sonorous left hand parts supported by sensitive pedalling. Field also had an affinity for ostinato patterns and pedal points, rather unusual for the prevailing styles of the day. Entirely representative of these traits are Field's 18 nocturnes and associated pieces such as Andante inedit, H 64. These works were some of the most influential music of the early Romantic period: they do not adhere to a strict formal scheme (such as the sonata form), and they create a mood without text or programme. These pieces were admired by Frédéric Chopin, who subsequently made the piano nocturne famous, and Franz Liszt, who published an edition of the nocturnes based on rare Russian sources that incorporated late revisions by Field. Liszt's preface to the said edition was an extensive eulogy for Field and his nocturnes.

Field also gave a few lessons to the young Mikhail Glinka, who was to become the first notable Russian composer.

Similarly influential were Field's early piano concertos, which occupy a central place in the development of the genre in the 19th century. Already the earliest of these works show competent and imaginative orchestration, and bold, original piano writing. One interesting trait of his piano concertos is their limited choice of keys: they all use either E-flat major or C major at some point (or both, in the last concerto's case). Composers such as Hummel, Kalkbrenner and Moscheles were influenced by these works, which are particularly notable for their central movements, frequently nocturne-like. Some of the less known works were also historically important: particularly the piano fantasies, in which Field pioneered the Romantic large scale episodic structure.

None of his piano sonatas, and only two of his seven piano concertos, have a formal slow movement. In performance, Field would interpolate an existing nocturne in a related key or improvise one.

List of works
This list is arranged according to Hopkinson numbers, introduced in the 1961 catalogue by Cecil Hopkinson. Many of these works were arranged for other instruments and (or) revised by the composer himself; such arrangements and revised versions are not listed.

Ephemera
In the Dublin suburb of Walkinstown there is a road called Field Avenue, one of a number of so called 'musical roads' named after prominent Irish musicians.

He is mentioned in passing in War and Peace when Countess Rostova calls on the Rostov household musician to play her favourite nocturne.

Also, in Tolstoy's Childhood, Field is said to have taught the narrator's mother to play: "Mamma was playing Field's second concerto. Field had been her master." (Everyman Library, trans. C. J. Hogarth.)

See also
 Nocturnes (Field)

Notes

References

Bibliography
 Boland, Majella (2013). John Field in Context: a Reappraisal of the Nocturne and Piano Concerti (PhD Dissertation, University College Dublin.
 Horton, Julian (2011). "John Field and the Alternative History of Concerto First-Movement Form", in Music and Letters, vol. 92, no. 1.
 Piggott, Patrick (1973). The Life and Music of John Field, 1782–1837, Creator of the Nocturne. London: Faber and Faber.

External links

1782 births
1837 deaths
19th-century classical composers
19th-century classical pianists
19th-century Irish people
19th-century male musicians
Burials at Vvedenskoye Cemetery
Deaths from pneumonia in Russia
Classical-period composers
Composers for piano
Irish classical composers
Irish classical pianists
Irish expatriates in Russia
Irish male classical composers
Male classical pianists
Musicians from Dublin (city)
Pupils of Muzio Clementi
Romantic composers